Anita Karim (Urdu: انیتا کریم) is a Pakistani mixed martial artist. She is the first international female Mixed Martial Arts (MMA) fighter from Pakistan to win multiple national and international-level bouts.

Early years 
Karim was born in Karimabad, Hunza Valley, Gilgit-Baltistan, Pakistan, in a family of MMA fighters. Karim, along with her brothers, Uloomi Karim [ur], Ehtisham Karim, and Ali Sultan, founded the MMA gym, "Fight Fortress", which is one of the first MMA training centers in Pakistan.

Achievements 
Karim emerged victorious with 7 gold medals and 1 silver medal at the Pakistan Grappling Challenge (PGC) 2017–2018.

On 28 February 2019, Karim won her One Warrior Series 4 (OWS) bout against Indonesia's Gita Suharsono. For this victory, she was awarded Rs. 100,000 by the Chief Minister of Gilgit-Baltistan, Hafiz Hafeezur Rehman. Karim also was given a shield as appreciation for her representation of Pakistan by the Governor of Gilgit-Baltistan, Raja Jalal Hussain Maqpoon.

On 19 February 2020, Karim unanimously won her match against Estonia's Marie Ruumet in One Warrior Series 10.

Mixed martial arts record 

|-
| Win
| align=center|3–2
| Uyen Ha
| Decision (unanimous)
| Fairtex Fight: Domination
| 
| align=center|3
| align=center|5:00
| Bangkok, Thailand
|
|-
| Loss
| align=center| 2–2
| Noelle Grandjean
| Decision (Unanimous)
|  Descendents of the Empire 2
| 
| align=center|3	
| align=center|5:00
| Bangkok, Thailand
|
|-
| Win
| align=center| 2–1
| Marie Ruumet
| Decision (Unanimous)
| ONE Warrior Series 10
| 
| align=center|3	
| align=center|5:00
| Kallang, Singapore
|
|-
| Win
| align=center| 1–1
| Gita Suharsono
| Decision (Unanimous)
| ONE Warrior Series 4
| 
| align=center|3	
| align=center|5:00
| Kallang, Singapore
|
|-
| Loss
| align=center| 0–1
| Nyrene Crowley
| Submission (Rear-Naked Choke)
| ONE Warrior Series 2
| 
| align=center|2	
| align=center|1:54
| Kallang, Singapore
|

References

External links
 Anita Karim at ONE Championship
 

Pakistani female mixed martial artists
Pakistani Ismailis
1996 births
Living people
People from Hunza